Kajetanowice  is a village in the administrative district of Gmina Gidle, within Radomsko County, Łódź Voivodeship, in central Poland.

History
On the night of 5 to 6 September 1939, the soldiers of the Wehrmacht completely burned the village and massacred about 76-80 Poles.(Pacyfikacja wsi Kajetanowice)

References

Kajetanowice